The Fat Truckers were a British electroclash group from Sheffield, comprising Ben Rymer, Mark Hudson and Ross Orton and briefly augmented by Jason Buckle and Ginger Dave as a part-time members.

They toured in support of Jarvis Cocker, apparently wielding light sabres on stage and described themselves as writing songs about "cheap motorbikes, import-export business and multiplex cinemas - we're a social comment on modern living" and having a fondness of Henderson's Relish.

The band split up in 2004. Orton now works in production with Pulp's Steve Mackey, and has recently worked with M.I.A. Rymer DJs as part of Gucci Soundsystem and Hudson has his own band, Meat for a Dark Day.

Discography

Albums
The First Fat Truckers Album Is for Sale (2003)

Singles
 "Superbike" (2001)
 "Teenage Daughter" (2001)
 "Anorexic Robot" (2003)

Remixes
 Louie Austen featuring Peaches - "Grab My Shaft" (2003)

References

External links
Fat Truckers website
The Rapture at Reviews on NME.com
Lengthy interview and pictures from Sandman (magazine)

English electronic music groups
Musical groups from Sheffield
British musical trios
Electroclash groups
Musical groups established in 2000
Musical groups disestablished in 2004